Lockerby Composite School is a high school located in the Lockerby neighbourhood of Greater Sudbury, Ontario, Canada, a short distance from Science North and James Jerome (Lily Creek) Sports Complex. Its motto is Scientia Nos Ducet ("Knowledge Will Lead Us"). Lockerby became the first public high school in Ontario to include a laptop program in its curriculum in September 1999, a program that has since expanded to half of the student population.

STEP Program

Lockerby was one of the first schools in Canada to offer the Science and Technology Education Program (STEP). STEP focuses on science and technology in addition to teaching regular academic courses at the same time. The program is interchangeable and customizable. There is a laptop option, and there are additional enrichment programs that are offered in certain courses such as math and English.

Student life

Lockerby Composite School offers students a wide range of co-curricular opportunities including, sports, clubs, and social events.  The Lockerby Students' Council has the responsibility of organizing many of these events. The current principal is Craig Runciman.

School facilities

The original building was erected in 1958 and has been greatly expanded over the years. The expansion job is traceable throughout the years, as the style of the building varies. Features include three gyms, computer labs, science labs, and over a dozen e-Labs: classrooms equipped with ceiling mount projectors, network connections for every student, and laser printers.

There has been an active effort by the school to refurbish the building, including:
a revamp of the south parking lot in 2007 to improve vehicle accessibility and student safety,
automatic doors installed near the Student Services office,
the sports field was regraded and re-sodded,
new locker doors installed,
a fence erected between the parking lot and the sports field, 
refurbishment of the main doors and exterior of the main office.

Sports
The Lockerby Wrestling Team has won the city championship for 11 years in a row.
The Lockerby boys and girls curling teams won gold at NOSSA and OFSAA (2007).  
The Senior Football Team has been very successful in recent years, winning two city championships and consistently making the playoffs.
The Lockerby Senior Boys Soccer team has won NOSSA (2006, 2007, 2008, 2009, 2010, 2012).

Notable alumni
Devon Kershaw - Olympic cross-country skier
Nick Foligno - NHL Hockey Player
 Eli Pasquale - Basketball Player, Canadian Olympic Team

See also
List of high schools in Ontario

References

External links
Lockerby Composite School's website

1958 establishments in Ontario
Educational institutions established in 1958
High schools in Greater Sudbury